This is a list of current and former Roman Catholic churches in the Roman Catholic Diocese of Monterey. The Archdiocese of Monterey includes the counties of Monterey, San Benito, San Luis Obispo, and Santa Cruz.

The churches in the Diocese of Monterey include the Cathedral of San Carlos in Monterey (the oldest stone building and the first cathedral in California) and seven former Spanish Missions: Carmel Mission Basillica; Mission Nuestra Señora de la Soledad; Mission San Antonio de Padua; Mission San Juan Bautista; Mission San Luis Obispo de Tolosa; Mission San Miguel Arcangel; and Mission Santa Cruz.

Monterey County

San Benito County

San Luis Obispo County

Santa Cruz County

References

 
Monterey